Shishu Park, alternatively known as Dhaka Shishu Park, is one of the many children's amusement parks in Dhaka City along with many other privately operated entertainment parks and amusement centres in Dhaka. It is located in the Shahbag area of Dhaka City in Bangladesh. The Bengali name 'Shishu Park' translates to 'Children's Park' in English. The Shishu Park is closed to visitors and the public at the moment, due to ongoing expansion, modernisation and renovation work, including a large underground car park, additional rides, etc. 

Established as a profit making venture by Bangladesh Parjatan Corporation, the Bangladesh government owned tourism promotion agency, it is maintained by Dhaka South City Corporation as an inexpensive entertainment park for children since 1983.

The many rides of the park include including a wheel train, a merry-go-round and a number of wheel-based rides. Bangladesh Air Force donated a fighter jet in 1992. The cheapest of all entertainment parks in Dhaka, charging a nominal fee of only BDT 10.00 for entry and 10.00 for each ride, it attracts over six thousand visitors a day. During the Eid-ul-Fitr holidays the number of visitors reaches up to three hundred and fifty thousand. The City Corporation earns about BDT 200 million annually from the park. The park is open Monday through Thursday and Saturday from 2:00 pm to 7:00 pm. On Fridays, it is open from 2:30 pm to 7:30 pm.

Renovation works are in schedule for the entire park due to some of the rides deteriorating in condition through time. As of 2007, a City Corporation plan to revamp the park for BDT 9 billion waits for approval of the Ministry for Local Government and Rural Development. At present, the Shishu Park is closed to visitors and the public due to ongoing modernisation and renovation work.

Gallery

References

Parks in Dhaka
Amusement parks in Bangladesh